John Arthur Pearson (born 23 April 1935) is an English former football player and manager who played in the Football League for Brentford and Queens Park Rangers. An inside left, he later had a long career in non-League football.

Playing career

Brentford 
An inside left, Pearson began his career at Third Division South club Brentford, after joining from Chase Of Chertsey in 1951. He was a part of the Brentford youth team which reached the semi-finals of the 1952–53 FA Youth Cup. He made his professional debut in a 3–0 victory over Colchester United on 10 September 1955. It proved to be his first of four appearances during the 1955–56 season. Pearson failed to establish himself in the first team at Griffin Park and made just one further appearance, before being released at the end of the 1957–58 season.

Queens Park Rangers 
Pearson transferred to West London rivals Queens Park Rangers in June 1958. He had a good start to his career at Loftus Road, scoring six goals in 16 Third Division appearances during the 1958–59 season. He scored three goals in five appearances during the 1959–60 season, before departing the club.

Non-League football 
After his release from Queens Park Rangers, Pearson dropped into non-League football, playing for Kettering Town, Dover, Folkestone Town, Stevenage Town, Crawley Town, Yiewsley and Chertsey Town.

Management career 
While with Chertsey Town, Pearson served as player-manager at the club.

Career statistics

References

1935 births
Footballers from Isleworth
English footballers
Brentford F.C. players
English Football League players
Queens Park Rangers F.C. players
Kettering Town F.C. players
Dover F.C. players
Southern Football League players
Association football inside forwards
Folkestone F.C. players
Stevenage Town F.C. players
Crawley Town F.C. players
Hillingdon Borough F.C. players
Chertsey Town F.C. players
Living people
Chertsey Town F.C. managers
English football managers